The 1999–2000 Bulgarian Cup was the 60th season of the Bulgarian Cup. Levski Sofia won the competition, beating Neftochimic Burgas 2–0 in the final at the Stadion Hristo Botev in Plovdiv.

First round
In this round entered winners from the preliminary rounds together with the teams from B Group.

|-
!colspan=3 style="background-color:#D0F0C0;" |13 October 1999

|}

Second round
This round featured winners from the First Round and all teams from A Group. 

|-
!colspan=3 style="background-color:#D0F0C0;" |27 October 1999

|}

Third round

|-
!colspan=5 style="background-color:#D0F0C0;" |10–11 November / 8 December 1999

|}

Quarter-finals

|-
!colspan=5 style="background-color:#D0F0C0;" |22 March 2000 / 5 April 2000

|}

Semi-finals

|-
!colspan=5 style="background-color:#D0F0C0;" |18 April 2000 / 1 May 2000

|}

Final

Details

References

1999-2000
1999–2000 domestic association football cups
Cup